The UK Rock & Metal Singles Chart is a record chart which ranks the best-selling rock and heavy metal songs in the United Kingdom. Compiled and published by the Official Charts Company, the data is based on each track's weekly physical sales, digital downloads and streams. In 2013, there were 15 singles that topped the 52 published charts. The first number-one single of the year was "Back in Black" by Australian hard rock band AC/DC, which spent the first week of the year atop the chart. AC/DC also had the final number-one single of the year, "Highway to Hell", which topped the chart in the final two weeks of 2013.

The most successful song on the UK Rock & Metal Singles Chart in 2013 was "Still Into You", the second single from Paramore's self-titled fourth studio album Paramore, which spent a total of seventeen weeks at number one during the year, including a single run of seven consecutive weeks. Fall Out Boy spent sixteen weeks at number one with four singles: "My Songs Know What You Did in the Dark (Light Em Up)", "The Phoenix", "Alone Together" and "Young Volcanoes". You Me at Six were number one for five weeks during the year, three of which were with "Lived a Lie" and two of which were for "Fresh Start Fever". "Iris" by Goo Goo Dolls was number one for four weeks, while Biffy Clyro spent four weeks at number one with two releases: "Black Chandelier" and "Opposite". AC/DC spent three weeks atop the chart in 2013.

Chart history

See also
2013 in British music
List of UK Rock & Metal Albums Chart number ones of 2013

References

External links
Official UK Rock & Metal Singles Chart Top 40 at the Official Charts Company
The Official UK Top 40 Rock Singles at BBC Radio 1

2013 in British music
United Kingdom Rock Singles
2013